Cherry Creek is a rural locality in the Toowoomba Region, Queensland, Australia. In the  Cherry Creek had a population of 49 people.

Geography 
Cherry Creek takes its name from Cherry Creek which rises within the locality and flows through it, becoming a tributary of Emu Creek, forming the south-eastern boundary of the location and flowing into the Brisbane River.

History
In the  Cherry Creek had a population of 49 people.

On 1 February 2018, Cherry Creek's postcode changed from 4306 to 4314.

References 

Toowoomba Region
Localities in Queensland